Córdoba, sometimes called Diario Córdoba, is a Spanish language newspaper from the city of Córdoba and is the major source of news from the  province. It has been published continuously since 25 July 1941.

History 

Founded on 25 July 1941, they were the successor of the Falangista newspaper Azul, the official organ of  Falange Española Tradicionalista y de las JONS in the province of Córdoba. For this reason, the newspaper belonged to the  during Francoist Spain. For almost forty years, it was the only newspaper that existed in the capital of Córdoba, having a modest circulation of about 5,000 copies during the 1940s and 1950s. At the beginning of the 1970s, circulation had increased to 9000 copies.

Following the death of Franco, Córdoba  began a period of dependence on the public body, Medios de Comunicación Social del Estado. On February 1, 1984, the State put the newspaper on sale,  where it was acquired by a private company with links to Spanish Socialist Workers' Party (PSOE) who until that time had served as principle editors of La Voz de Córdoba —and which would cease publication the same year that the organization acquired Córdoba —. Subsequently, Córdoba was acquired by Grupo Zeta. Until 2000, the newspaper enjoyed an absolute hegemony in Córdoba, having in 1999 a market share of 67%, having no rival publications in the province. However, since that time, it has had to deal with other competing newspapers in the province including ABC de Córdoba —edited by Vocento, and  El Día de Córdoba  which is published by Grupo Joly.  As a result, their share of the market has fallen to 34%.

In 2009, the second analysis by Estudio general de medios (EGM) said that Córdoba was the fifth largest periodical in Andalucía, with an audience of 104.000 readers— behind newspapers such as Sur from Málaga, ABC from Sevilla and Diario de Cádiz—.  For 2010, they had 89.000 readers and daily circulation 13.491 newspapers.

Directors

Notes

References

Bibliography

External links 
 Official website

1941 in Spain
Francoist Spain
Publications established in 1941
Granada
Spanish-language newspapers
Spanish news websites